Kenneth Joel Hotz (born May 3, 1967) is a Canadian comedy writer, producer, entertainer and television personality. He is best known as the star of the reality comedy show Kenny vs. Spenny alongside Spencer Rice. Hotz is the creator of the FX series Testees, and Kenny Hotz's Triumph of the Will. Between 2004 and 2006, he served as a staff writer (and later occasional writer) for South Park. Hotz has directed a number of films including Pitch, It Don't Cost Nothin' to Say Good Morning and Subscribe. He also co-directed the music video for the song Monophobia by Deadmau5. Hotz is a regular contributor for Vice Media and began his career as a war correspondent and photo-journalist during the Gulf War.

Early life and education 
Hotz was born to a Jewish family and graduated from the Forest Hill Collegiate Institute.  In 1992, Hotz graduated from the Media Arts program at the Ryerson Polytechnical Institute. Hotz met Spencer Rice in high school, and the pair later went on to direct films together and create Kenny vs Spenny. As a teenager and young adult, Hotz dealt cannabis.

Career

Photo-journalism 
Hotz began as a documentary filmmaker and news photographer, creating photo essays on subjects including Auschwitz, Dachau, and the Gulf War. Hotz was the only registered Canadian photo-journalist to cover the Gulf War. His additional photo essays also include Needle Park in Zürich, Switzerland, David Koresh, Mount Carmel, Romanian orphanages after Nicolae Ceauşescu and New Year's Eve 2000 in Times Square. Both national and provincial archives have purchased his work for their collections.

Early film work 
Hotz and Spencer Rice created the 18-minute short film It Don't Cost Nothin' to Say Good Morning.

In 1996, Hotz created and starred (with Rice) in the documentary Pitch which premiered at the Toronto International Film Festival in 1997. The film had numerous cameos including Al Pacino, Samuel Z. Arkoff and Neil Simon.

In 1997, he co-wrote an episode of Ninja Turtles: The Next Mutation with Rice, titled Truce or Consequences.

In 1999, Hotz moved with his long-time writing partner Rice to Los Angeles, where they worked on the development of the show Kenny vs. Spenny.

The Papal Chase 
Hotz starred in his second feature film titled The Papal Chase, a documentary about Hotz trying to meet the Pope John Paul II, released in 2004. The film received the Phillip Borsos Award for Best Canadian Feature Film at the 2004 Whistler Film Festival, and in 2005 won the People's Choice Award for Best Canadian Feature at the Canadian Filmmakers Festival and the Audience Award for Best Documentary at the Brooklyn International Film Festival.

Kenny vs. Spenny 

Kenny vs. Spenny was first aired on CBC Television in 2003 and went on to be nominated for eight Gemini awards. The original pilot had been commissioned by USA Network, but never aired before the show was picked up by the CBC for 26 episodes. The series centred on Hotz and friend Spencer Rice as they competed against each other in competitions, the loser of which would perform a "humiliation". The show was embroiled in a deliberate controversy with the British Columbia Human Rights Commission for Hotz's actions in the episode Who Can Piss Off More People, where he paid to have a plane fly over Toronto dragging a banner that reads "Jesus Sucks". Though he claimed his friend Jesus was getting married and it was not directed towards a religion. The show moved from CBC to Showcase television in Canada after the nationally run CBC censored two episodes of Kenny vs. Spenny, refusing to air them on their network.

In 2004, Hotz also created the concept for the videogame Versusville to accompany the television show, which was nominated for a Canadian New Media Award for Excellence in Gaming.

In 2009, Maclean's magazine named Kenny vs. Spenny the number eight pick in its list of the top ten Canadian television shows of the previous decade. The magazine said of the show and Kenny's on air role that, "Many episodes feature the evil Kenny destroying his supposed friend through deceit, trickery and blatant cheating." Hotz produced the German spinoff series Elton vs. Simon that aired between 2004 and 2006. Kenny vs. Spenny show was broadcast in over 25 countries and licensed globally, with remakes including Cenk vs. Erdem in Turkey, Juan vs. Roman in Colombia, Katja vs. Bridget in the Netherlands, and Ed vs. Spencer in the UK. This resulted in the show becoming the largest selling comedy format in Canadian television history. The show was named #8 among the top 10 Canadian television shows of the 21st century. In July 2013, the show was ranked as the highest rated reality television show by IMDb.

The last episode, ("The Kenny vs. Spenny Christmas Special"), was aired in 2010. The series produced 89 original episodes, over six seasons. Each of the main characters of the show would go on to have their own shows the following year.

In 2014, a fan campaign to have the show return to production on Netflix began, following Hotz's announcement that he and Spenny were planning the live comedy tour Kenny vs. Spenny vs. Canada. Also that year, Hotz and Rice designed a traveling stage show based on the show with a world tour of approximately 100 dates. Part of this tour included the Canadian national Kenny vs. Spenny vs. Canada tour.

In November 2020, along with Spencer Rice, Hotz directed, wrote and produced Kenny & Spenny: Paldemic, a CBC Gem special that focused on the pair's friendship and careers since Kenny vs. Spenny ended in 2010.

South Park and Comedy Central 

Hotz worked as a consultant and writer on South Park, providing material for episodes including "Follow That Egg!" and "Two Days Before the Day After Tomorrow". Between 2004 and 2006 Hotz was a consultant writer, and sometimes staff writer, for 42 different episodes of the show, returning again in 2012 to write for the episode "Cartman Finds Love". Trey Parker and Matt Stone, the creators of South Park, joined to help produce future episodes of Kenny vs. Spenny in the fall of 2007, when the show began airing on Comedy Central, becoming executive producers. They stated that they first came across the show while staying up late finishing their movie Team America: World Police, when they viewed the episode "Who Can Stay Awake the Longest?" from the show's first season. The Writers Guild of America named him and the rest of the South Park writing staff as the 63rd best writing team in television history.

Testees 

In 2008, Hotz created the sitcom Testees for FX Networks, producing 13 shows centering on two roommates who work as guinea pigs for a mediocre product testing facility. The show produced 13 episodes and started airing in October 2008 on FX. Hotz stated that the inspiration of the series was Woody Allen's character Fielding Mellish in the film Bananas. The show met with positive reviews. In a review for The Washington Post, Tom Shales referred to the show as "wall-to-wall uproarious."

Kenny Hotz's Triumph of the Will 

In 2011, Hotz starred and produced a new series titled Kenny Hotz's Triumph of the Will, which premiered on Canada's Action network on July 22, 2011. The series produced six episodes and showed Hotz attempting to complete major tasks that challenged the social assumptions of both his audience and himself, including the building of a Jewish funded mosque for Muslims, and finding his widowed mother a new boyfriend. The show was shot on location in countries including Canada, the US, and France.

Vice 
Hotz is an executive producer, host and columnist for Vice, and won the publication's best fiction article of the year award in 2006. In 2015, he directed and starred in the Vice talk show Me on You. Then in 2016 Vice Media aired a TV special starring Hotz, entitled Getting an Election executive produced by Spike Jonze. It was nominated for the Academy of Canadian Television and Cinema award for Best Original Series produced for Digital Media – Non-Fiction. Focusing on the 2016 US presidential election and interviews Hotz performed with citizens on the streets of the US, BuzzFeed called the piece the "most honest and objective piece of journalism this whole election". Hotz has also been involved as a spokesperson and on-stage presence at Vice Media project and network launches.

Other work 

In 2013, Hotz signed a deal with Sirius Radio in the U.S. for a weekly radio show that airs in Canada and the United States. In 2015, he had a role in the film The Chickening, which premiered at the Toronto International Film Festival. He also served as the film's producer. In 2018, Hotz co-directed a music video for the track "Monophobia" by Deadmau5. The video was later nominated for the Prism Prize.

Business ventures and involvement in restaurants 
Hotz owned The Hoxton, a bar and music venue in Toronto which has since closed. In December 2013, The Hoxton was the site of an impromptu post-concert performance by Kanye West and Drake.

Hotz owns the Dog & Bear restaurant and bar in Toronto.

In 2018, Hotz was a judge for the Canada's Top 100 Restaurants competition.

Personal life 

Hotz identifies as an atheist. He can speak Hebrew.

Hotz is the godson of folk singer Joni Mitchell.

In 2007, Hotz married former model Audrey Gair; the couple have three children.

Filmography

Appearances in other media

Awards and nominations

Film and television

Writing

Honours and accolades 
In November 2013, Hotz was nominated for the "Digital Personality of the Year" at the Canadian Digi Awards.

In 2013, he received the "Sovereign's Medal for Volunteers" from the Governor General of Canada for his work supporting childhood survivors of sexual abuse.

References

External links 

 Official website
 YouTube channel
 

Canadian bloggers
Jewish Canadian writers
Canadian television personalities
Comedians from Toronto
Jewish Canadian male actors
Male actors from Toronto
Writers from Toronto
1967 births
Living people
Canadian people of Israeli descent
Jewish Canadian comedians
Jewish male comedians
Canadian sketch comedians
Male bloggers
Canadian atheists
Jewish atheists
21st-century Canadian comedians
Canadian male comedians
Canadian Comedy Award winners